The Hessian (from Hesse in Germany) is a style of light boot that became popular from the beginning of the 19th century.

History and description

First worn by German soldiers in the 18th century, these military riding boots became popular in England, particularly during the Regency period (1811–1820), with their polished leather and ornamental tassels. Initially used as standard issue footwear for light cavalry regiments, especially hussars, they would become widely worn by civilians as well.

The boots had a low heel, and a semi-pointed toe that made them practical for mounted troops, as they allowed easy use of stirrups. They reached to the knee and had a decorative tassel at the top of each shaft, with a "v" notch in front.
The Hessian boot would evolve into the rubber work boots known as "Wellington boots" and the cowboy boot.

See also
Hessian (soldier)

References

External links

Footwear History

18th-century fashion
19th-century fashion
Boots
Historical footwear
History of clothing (Western fashion)